Juan Manuel Guayasamin (born 1974) is an Ecuadorian biologist. He earned his Ph.D. in 2007 from University of Kansas, Department of Ecology and Evolutionary Biology and as of 2017 he is working as professor at Universidad San Francisco de Quito in Ecuador.  His research interests include the evolution of glass frogs (Centrolenidae) and direct-developing anurans. His main contributions have been: phylogenetic taxonomy of glassfrogs, description of the variation of skin texture in frogs, description of numerous species of amphibians and reptiles, and a monographic review of all Ecuadorian glassfrogs (60 species). A team led by Juan M. Guayasamin discovered Hyalinobatrachium yaku in May 2017, a glassfrog with transparent venter.  To date (2020), he has described a total of 6 amphibian genera, 55 species of amphibians, and 11 reptiles, including two geckos from the Galápagos Islands.

Genera described
 Celsiella
 Chimerella
 Espadarana
 Ikakogi
 Rulyrana
 Sachatamia
 Vitreorana

Selected publications
 2008 - Guayasamin, J. M., Castroviejo-Fisher, S., Ayarzagüena, J., Trueb, L., Vilà, C - Molecular Phylogenetics and Evolution 48 (2), 574-595
 2009 - Guayasamin, J. M., Castroviejo-Fisher, S., Trueb, L., Ayarzagüena, J., Rada, M., Vilà, C. "Phylogenetic systematics of Glassfrogs (Amphibia: Centrolenidae) and their sister taxon Allophryne ruthveni." Zootaxa 2100: 1-97
 2013 - Vences, M., Guayasamin, J. M., Miralles, A., & De La Riva, I. To name or not to name: Criteria to promote economy of change in Linnaean classification schemes. Zootaxa, 3636(2), 201-244.
 2015 - Guayasamin, J. M., T. Krynak, K. Krynak, J. Culebras, C. R. Hutter. Phenotypic plasticity raises questions for taxonomically important traits: a remarkable new Andean rainfrog (Pristimantis) with the ability to change skin texture. Zoological Journal of the Linnean Society, 173: 913–928. 
 2019 - Arteaga, A., Bustamante, L., Vieira, J., Tapia, W., Guayasamin, J. M. Reptiles of the Galápagos: Life on the Enchanted Islands. Tropical Herping, Quito, 208 pp.
 2020 - Guayasamin JM, DF Cisneros-Heredia, RW McDiarmid, P Peña, CR Hutter. Glassfrog of Ecuador: diversity, evolution, and conservation. Diversity, 12 (222): 1–285 (doi:10.3390/d12060222).

References

External links

1974 births
Living people
Herpetologists